Gato Negro is a Caracas Metro station on Line 1. It was opened on 2 January 1983 as part of the inaugural section of Line 1 between Propatria and La Hoyada. The station is between Plaza Sucre and Agua Salud.

References 

Caracas Metro stations
1983 establishments in Venezuela
Railway stations opened in 1983